Robbery is the crime of taking or attempting to take anything of value by force, threat of force, or by use of fear. According to common law, robbery is defined as taking the property of another, with the intent to permanently deprive the person of that property, by means of force or fear; that is, it is a larceny or theft accomplished by an assault. Precise definitions of the offence may vary between jurisdictions. Robbery is differentiated from other forms of theft (such as burglary, shoplifting, pickpocketing, or car theft) by its inherently violent nature (a violent crime); whereas many lesser forms of theft are punished as misdemeanors, robbery is always a felony in jurisdictions that distinguish between the two. Under English law, most forms of theft are triable either way, whereas robbery is triable only on indictment. The word "rob" came via French from Late Latin words (e.g., deraubare) of Germanic origin, from Common Germanic raub "theft".

Among the types of robbery are armed robbery, which involves the use of a weapon, and aggravated robbery, when someone brings with them a deadly weapon or something that appears to be a deadly weapon. Highway robbery or mugging takes place outside or in a public place such as a sidewalk, street, or parking lot. Carjacking is the act of stealing a car from a victim by force. Extortion is the threat to do something illegal, or the offer to not do something illegal, in the event that goods are not given, primarily using words instead of actions.

Criminal slang for robbery includes "blagging" (armed robbery, usually of a bank) or "stick-up" (derived from the verbal command to robbery targets to raise their hands in the air), and "steaming" (organized robbery on underground train systems).

Canada 

In Canada, the Criminal Code makes robbery an indictable offence, subject to a maximum penalty of life imprisonment.  If the accused uses a restricted or prohibited firearm to  commit robbery, there is a mandatory minimum sentence of five years for the first offence, and seven years for subsequent offences.

Republic of Ireland 
Robbery is a statutory offence in the Republic of Ireland. It is created by section 14(1) of the Criminal Justice (Theft and Fraud Offences) Act 2001, which provides:

United Kingdom

England and Wales 
Robbery is a statutory offence created by section 8(1) of the Theft Act 1968 which reads:

Aggravated theft

Robbery is the only offence of aggravated theft.

Aggravated robbery

There are no offences of aggravated robbery.

"Steals" 
This requires evidence to show a theft as set out in section 1(1) of the Theft Act 1968. In R v Robinson the defendant threatened the victim with a knife in order to recover money which he was actually owed. His conviction for robbery was quashed on the basis that Robinson had an honest, although unreasonable, belief (under Section 2(1)(a) of the Act) in his legal right to the money. See also R v Skivington [1968] 1 QB 166, [1967] 2 WLR 655, 131 JP 265, 111 SJ 72, [1967] 1 All ER 483, 51 Cr App R 167, CA.

In R v Hale (1978) the application of force and the stealing took place in many different locations, and it was not possible to establish the timing; it was held that the appropriation necessary to prove theft was a continuing act, and the jury could correctly convict of robbery. This approach was followed in R v Lockley (1995) when the force was applied to a shopkeeper after property had been taken. It was argued that the theft should be regarded as complete by this time, and R v Gomez (1993), should apply; the court disagreed, preferring to follow R v Hale.

Actual or threatened force against a person 
The threat or use of force must take place immediately before or at the time of the theft. Force used after the theft is complete will not turn the theft into a robbery.

The words "or immediately after" that appeared in section 23(1)(b) of the Larceny Act 1916 were deliberately omitted from section 8(1).

The book Archbold said that the facts in R v Harman, which did not amount to robbery in 1620, would not amount to robbery now.

It was held in R v Dawson and James (1978) that "force" is an ordinary English word and its meaning should be left to the jury. This approach was confirmed in  R v Clouden (1985) and Corcoran v Anderton (1980), both handbag-snatching cases. Stealing may involve a young child who is not aware that taking other persons' property is not in order.

Threat 
The victim must be placed in apprehension or fear that force would be used immediately before or at the time of the taking of the property. A threat is not immediate if the wrongdoer threatens to use force of violence some future time.

Robbery occurs if an aggressor forcibly snatched a mobile phone or if they used a knife to make an implied threat of violence to the holder and then took the phone. The person being threatened does not need to be the owner of the property. It is not necessary that the victim was actually frightened, but the defendant must have put or sought to put the victim or some other person in fear of immediate force.

The force or threat may be directed against a third party, for example a customer in a jeweller's shop. Theft accompanied by a threat to damage property will not constitute robbery, but it may disclose an offence of blackmail.

Dishonestly dealing with property stolen during a robbery will constitute an offence of handling.

Mode of trial 
Robbery is an indictable-only offence.

Sentence 

Under current sentencing guidelines, the punishment for robbery is affected by a variety of aggravating and mitigating factors. Particularly important is how much harm was caused to the victim and how much culpability the offender had (e.g. carrying a weapon or leading a group effort implies high culpability). Robbery is divided into three categories which are, in increasing order of seriousness: street or less sophisticated commercial; dwelling; and professionally planned commercial.

Robbery generally results in a custodial sentence. Only a low-harm, low-culpability robbery with other mitigating factors would result in an alternative punishment, in the form of a high level community order. The maximum legal punishment is imprisonment for life. It is also subject to the mandatory sentencing regime under the Criminal Justice Act 2003. Current sentencing guidelines advise that the sentence should be no longer than 20 years, for a high-harm, high-culpability robbery with other aggravating factors.

The "starting point" sentences are:
Low-harm, low-culpability street robbery: 1 year
Medium-harm, medium-culpability street robbery: 4 years
Medium-harm, medium-culpability professionally planned robbery: 5 years
High-harm, high-culpability street robbery: 8 years
High-harm, high-culpability professionally planned robbery: 16 years
An offender may also serve a longer sentence if they are convicted of other offences alongside the robbery, such as assault and grievous bodily harm.

History

Common law 
Robbery was an offence under the common law of England. Matthew Hale provided the following definition:

The common law offence of robbery was abolished for all purposes not relating to offences committed before 1 January 1969 by section 32(1)(a) of the Theft Act 1968.

Statute 
See sections 40 to 43 of the Larceny Act 1861.

Section 23 of the Larceny Act 1916 read:

This section provided maximum penalties for a number of offences of robbery and aggravated robbery.

Assault with intent to rob 
If a robbery is foiled before it can be completed, an alternative offence (with the same penalty, given by section 8(2) of the 1968 Act) is assault; any act which intentionally or recklessly causes another to fear the immediate and unlawful use of force, with an intent to rob, will suffice.

The following cases are relevant:
 R v Trusty and Howard (1783) 1 East PC 418
 R v Sharwin (1785) 1 East PC 421

Mode of trial and sentence

Assault with intent to rob is an indictable-only offence. It is punishable with imprisonment for life or for any shorter term.

Assault with intent to rob is also subject to the mandatory sentencing regime under the Criminal Justice Act 2003.

Northern Ireland 
Robbery is a statutory offence in Northern Ireland. It is created by section 8 of the Theft Act (Northern Ireland) 1969.

United States 
In the United States, robbery is generally treated as an aggravated form of common law larceny. Specific elements and definitions differ from state to state. The common elements of robbery are:
 a trespassory
 taking and
 carrying away
 of the personal property
 of another
 with the intent to steal
 from the person or presence of the victim
 by force or threat of force.

The first six elements are the same as common law larceny. It is the last two elements that aggravate the crime to common law robbery.

from the person or presence of the victim – robbery requires that the property be taken directly from the person of the victim or from their presence. This is different from larceny which simply requires that property be taken from the victim's possession, actual or constructive. Property is "on the victim's person" if the victim is actually holding the property, or the property is contained within clothing the victim is wearing or is attached to a victim's body such as a watch or earrings. Property is in a person's presence when it is within the area of their immediate control. The property has to be close enough to the victim's person that the victim could have prevented its taking if he/she had not been placed in fear or intimidation.

by force or threat of force – the use of force or threat of force is the defining element of robbery. For there to be robbery there must be "force or fear" in perpetrating the theft. Questions concerning the degree of force necessary for robbery have been the subject of much litigation. Merely snatching the property from the victim's person is not sufficient force unless the victim resists or one of the items is attached or carried in such a way that a significant amount of force must be used to free the item from the victim's person.

For robbery the victim must be placed in "fear" of immediate harm by threat or intimidation. The threat need not be directed at the victim personally. Threats to third parties are sufficient. The threat must be one of present rather than future personal harm. Fear does not mean "fright", it means apprehension – an awareness of the danger of immediate bodily harm.

California 
The maximum sentence for robbery in California is 9 years, according to Penal Code section 213(a)(1)(A).

The threat or use of force does not have to take place immediately before or at the time of the theft. Force used after the theft will turn the theft into a robbery unless the theft is complete. The theft is considered completed when the perpetrator reaches a place of temporary safety with the property.

Robbery statistics

Robberies by country 

The United Nations Office on Drugs and Crime notes "that when using the figures, any cross-national comparisons should be conducted with caution because of the differences that exist between the legal definitions of offences in countries, or the different methods of offence counting and recording". Also not every single crime is reported, meaning two things; (1) robbery rates are going to appear lower than they actually are and; (2) the percentage of crime that is not reported is going to be higher in some countries then others, for example – in one country 86% of the robberies were reported, whereas in another country only 67% of the robberies were reported. The last thing to note is that crime will vary by certain neighborhoods or areas in each country, so, just because a nationwide rate is a specified rate, does not mean that everywhere in that country retains the same amount of danger or safety. A 1983 study by the Department of Justice estimated that the amount of robberies in the US at schools alone may reach one million a year, exceeding the National Crime Survey reported estimate.

Homicides during a robbery, by country

In popular culture 

Robberies have been depicted, sometimes graphically, in various forms of media, and several robbers have become pop icons, such as Bonnie and Clyde and John Dillinger. Examples of media works focused on robberies include:

In film 
 The Killing (1956), by Stanley Kubrick, depicts a graphic robbery.
 Wake Up and Die (1966) is an Italian crime drama film directed by Carlo Lizzani, based on the real life of Luciano Lutring ("il solista del mitra", translation: "the submachine soloist"), who kept his weapon in a violin case.
 Take the Money and Run (1969), by Woody Allen, depicts an unconventional view of a robbery by an incompetent robber.
 Le Gitan (1975), directed by José Giovanni, is loosely based on Luciano Lutring's autobiography. Lutring is played by Alain Delon.
 Dog Day Afternoon (1975) depicts a bank robbery which escalates to a hostage situation. 
 Reservoir Dogs (1992), by Quentin Tarantino, shows the aftermath of a robbery, with an abundance of lurid details.

In literature 
 Luciano Lutring (30 December 1937 – 13 May 2013), known as "the submachine gun soloist" because he kept the weapon in a violin case, used that moniker as the title of his memoir Il solista del mitra. He  was an Italian criminal, author, and painter who, when committing robberies, worked alone (which is rather rare for a robber).
 Lionel White's Bloodhound mysteries novel, No.116, Clean Break (1955) was the basis for Stanley Kubrik's film The Killing (1956).

In video games 
Video games Payday: The Heist and Payday 2 are both games by Overkill Software where one of the main objectives is to steal items of monetary value at places such as banks, art galleries, armored trucks, and more.

See also

References 
 Matthew Hale. Historia Placitorum Coronae. 1736. 1800 Edition. Volume 1. Chapter XLVI. Pages 532 to 538.

Further reading 

 Allen, Michael. (2005). Textbook on Criminal Law. Oxford: Oxford University Press. .
 Criminal Law Revision Committee. 8th Report. Theft and Related Offences. Cmnd. 2977
 Griew, Edward. Theft Acts 1968 & 1978. London: Sweet & Maxwell. London: LexisNexis.

External links 

 
Crimes
Illegal occupations